Eldie Anthony (pronounced LD Anthony) (born Elexcian Eldemire); is a Recording Artist, songwriter, and producer stemming from Kingston, Jamaica. Born January 28, 1984 in Kingston, Jamaica), he began singing at a young age yet in 2004 he decided to dedicate his life to a career in music.  He began working with various composers and producers.

Career

In 2007, he then found his way to Harmony House where he started to master his sound.  The great Reggae icon Beres Hammond took him under his wing where he spent the next four years being mentored by the Reggae powerhouse himself.

In 2011, at a session in Anchor Recording studio, he was introduced to Music Industry Executive, Christina Grand of the Music Embassies, who was also in charge of the official embassy for the reggae industry; Reggae Embassy.  He later contacted the organization to learn more.  In May of that year, he began to fully utilize the organization for his career development, advancement, bookings and publishing through Elite Embassy Publishing. The Reggae Embassy launched the official website for the Jamaican recording artist Eldie Anthony which consists of his music, photos, music videos, news and updates of the artist

In 2013, the Music Embassies featured many of Eldie Anthony's songs on their first compilation album; Music Embassies Spotlight Volume 1.

On February 17, 2015, Eldie Anthony released his debut double album entitled "Break Free" which was produced by the Reggae Embassy, Christina Grand and Eldie Anthony.  It consists of two distinct sides entitled "Break Free - Reggae Vibration" and "Break Free - Yaadstream".

Discography

 Jah Is By My Side (2013) – Composed By Asha D - Produced by Christina Grand, Eldie Anthony
 I Will Go On (2011) – Composed By DJ Rhome - Produced by DJ Rhome, Eldie Anthony, Christina Grand
 Singing in the Rain(2012) – Composed By El Toro - Produced by Christina Grand, Eldie Anthony
 Break Free (2013) – Composed By Mantis Tan Tan - Produced by Mantis Tan Tan, Christina Grand
 Want Mi Share (2013) – Composed By Bena Di Senior - Produced by Bena Di Senior
 Let Me Be Your Man (2012) – Composed By DJ Lanz 876 - Produced by Christina Grand
 Let Me Be Your Man Reggae Remix (2015) – Composed By Askell - Produced by Christina Grand, Askell - Vision House Records
 Living for Tomorrow (Featuring I-Noble) (2013) – Composed By DJ Lanz 876 - Produced by Christina Grand, Eldie Anthony
 Dance If You're Dancing (2011) – (Featuring Ma'Niche) (2013) – Composed By Roadz - Produced by Christina Grand, Roadz

References

External links
Eldie Anthony official website

1984 births
Living people
Jamaican reggae musicians
Jamaican dancehall musicians
Musicians from Kingston, Jamaica
Jamaican male songwriters